Jeremy Michael London (born November 7, 1972) is an American actor. He is best known for his regular roles on Party of Five, 7th Heaven, and I'll Fly Away, a starring role in the 1995 comedy film Mallrats, as well as a notable supporting role in the Civil War epic Gods and Generals. London made his directorial debut with the 2013 horror film The Devil's Dozen, in which he also appeared.

Early life
London was born in San Diego, California, the son of Debbie (née Osborn), a waitress, and Frank London, a sheet metal worker. He was raised mainly in DeSoto, Texas. After divorcing Jeremy's father, his mother moved the family 13 times in six years. His identical twin brother, Jason, is older by 27 minutes and is also an actor. Jeremy has worked mostly in television while Jason has opted for a career in feature films. The two have acted alongside each other only once – in the February 3, 2003 episode of the WB's 7th Heaven, entitled "Smoking." They have also competed for the same role – Jeremy's first audition was for a part in the 1991 film The Man in the Moon, which Jason won, leaving Jeremy the part of his brother's stunt double.

Career
London's first and second major television roles were playing Nathan on the critically acclaimed 1991–1993 drama series I'll Fly Away. His brother Jason stepped in for Jeremy for the final episode of the show.

In 1995 he played T.S. Quint in Kevin Smith's second film, Mallrats.

In 1995, he joined the cast of the Fox series Party of Five, playing Griffin Holbrook for three seasons, after serving as a recurring guest star. He then went on to play a young minister named Chandler Hampton on 7th Heaven from 2002 to 2004. His 7th Heaven character had a father with lung cancer, much like Jeremy's real-life family members. He has since been in many TV serials, TV movies and feature films.

London was a cast member during the fourth season of Celebrity Rehab with Dr. Drew, which premiered on VH1 in December 2010.

Personal life
London and his wife Melissa Cunningham were married in September 2006. They divorced five years later. They have a son named Lyrik.
London married Juliet Reeves on June 3, 2014 and they have one son named Wyatt who was born in June 2014.

In June 2010, Jeremy alleged that he was involved in a bizarre kidnapping, approached by a group of men in Palm Springs, Calif., and forced to drive around for 12 hours purchasing alcohol and using drugs. Though he swore the incident was real, his mother and brother made public statements doubting the events. Jeremy filed a restraining order against them, only to have it denied by a judge.

London was a cast member during the fourth season of Celebrity Rehab with Dr. Drew, which aired on VH1 from December 2010 to January 2011, and depicted his treatment for addiction at the Pasadena Recovery Center in Pasadena, California. The third episode of that season depicted discussions involving him, Dr. Drew Pinsky and London's wife, Melissa Cunningham, who was simultaneously being treated for addiction herself at a separate wing of the Center. His father, Frank, also appeared in Episode 7, which was filmed during Family Day, in which the patients discussed the effect of addiction on their family relationships.

Filmography

References

External links 
 

1972 births
20th-century American male actors
21st-century American male actors
American male film actors
American male television actors
Formerly missing people
Identical twin male actors
Living people
Male actors from San Diego
Male actors from Texas
Participants in American reality television series
People from DeSoto, Texas
American twins